Obelia geniculata is a species of cnidarian belonging to the family Campanulariidae.

The species has cosmopolitan distribution.

Population genetics 
Estimates of divergence times and distinctive haplotypes provide evidence of glacial refugia around Iceland and southeastern Canada. In one study, O. geniculata was first documented in these areas in the 1990s but were later found in Massachusetts and Japan in the 2000s. There are three reciprocally monophyletic clades of Obelia, one branch for the North Atlantic, one for Japan, and one for New Zealand. There seems to be an ancestral haplotype that occurs in the North Atlantic populations from Massachusetts, New Brunswick, and Iceland. The population from Woods Hole, MA shows less genetic diversity than the New Brunswick population. The more recent expansion of these haplotypes demonstrates the southward movement of hydroid populations, possibly due to climate change. The North Atlantic populations contain ancestral haplotypes, which differ from the populations in Japan and New Zealand. Pacific populations have more haplotype diversity than all four of the North Atlantic populations, which indicates that the North Atlantic population is more recently established than the Pacific population. The minimum estimated age of the New Brunswick population is between 47 and 143 thousand years old. Including the Massachusetts population, this number is between 82 and 150 thousand years, but Iceland has the oldest estimated population with the minimum age ranging from 68 to 204 thousand years old.

Obelia are distinguishable from others in Campanulariidae from their size in length and diameter, as well as their smaller hydrothecal cusps and relatively thinner perisarc thickness. Some morphological traits are hard to distinguish across species, so observing a combination of these traits will help with identification. Other useful observable characteristics are branching pattern of colonies and length of trophosome. There are variations and exceptions to these, which makes identification even more difficult. O. geniculata is characterized by a thicker perisarc with more variation that other species of Obelia. O. longissima have longer first and second order branches, in addition to a greater variation in hydrothecal cusp length than others in the genus. O. bidentata differs from the previous species due to their more cylindrical and longer hydrothecal cusps.

References

Campanulariidae